is a Japanese politician of the Democratic Party of Japan, a member of the House of Councillors in the Diet (national legislature). A native of Anō, Mie and graduate of Meiji University, he was elected to the House of Councillors for the first time in 2000 after running unsuccessfully for the House of Representatives in 1998.

References

External links 
 Official website in Japanese.

Members of the House of Councillors (Japan)
Living people
1956 births
Democratic Party of Japan politicians
Meiji University alumni